Łaziska  is a village in Opole Lubelskie County, Lublin Voivodeship, in eastern Poland. It is the seat of the gmina (administrative district) called Gmina Łaziska.

The village has a population of 560.

References

Villages in Opole Lubelskie County